Prospect Hill is a neighborhood of the north end neighborhood of Tacoma, Washington.  Although Prospect Hill is considered to be the official planning name of the area, it has also gone by many other names. Locals commonly refer to it as Little Germany because of its narrow roads; it vaguely resembles a residential neighborhood that could be found somewhere in Europe. Prospect Hill is a small neighborhood with large, expensive houses. The area borders on Yakama Gulch to the west, overlooks Commencement Bay to the north, and has sweeping views of Old Tacoma to the east.

The few houses with views of the waterfront - mostly located on North and Orchard Roads - are some of the most expensive properties in the city and often sell for well over $1 million as of April 2006.

North Tacoma, Washington
Neighborhoods in Tacoma, Washington